Shipwreck Kelly may refer to:
Alvin "Shipwreck" Kelly, an American pole sitter
John Simms "Shipwreck" Kelly, an American football player